Orcesis is a genus of beetles in the family Cerambycidae, containing the following species:

 Orcesis fuscoapicalis Breuning, 1962
 Orcesis ochreosignata Breuning & de Jong, 1941
 Orcesis phauloides Pascoe, 1866
 Orcesis unicolor Breuning, 1954
 Orcesis variegata (Fisher, 1933)

References

Apomecynini